Boulleret is a commune in the Cher department in the Centre-Val de Loire region of France.

Geography

Population

Sights
 The church of St. Marie-Madeleine, dating from the fifteenth century.
 Roman remains at Peseau.
 The fifteenth-century castle of Buranlure.
 Several ancient houses.
 The Château du Peseau, dating from the fourteenth century.

See also
Communes of the Cher department

References

External links

The castle of Buranlure
Photos of the castle of Buranlure

Communes of Cher (department)